Robert L. DuPont (born March 25, 1936 in Toledo, Ohio) is an American psychiatrist, known for his advocacy in the field of substance abuse. He is president of the Institute for Behavior and Health, whose mission is "to reduce the use of illegal drugs". He has written books including Chemical Slavery: Understanding Addiction and Stopping the Drug Epidemic, The Selfish Brain: Learning from Addiction, as well as Drug Testing in Treatment Settings, Drug Testing in Schools, and Drug Testing in Correctional Settings, published by the Hazelden Foundation. DuPont is a fellow of the American Society of Addiction Medicine and a life fellow of the American Psychiatric Association.

He has described marijuana as "the most dangerous drug", a description contradicted by current scientific consensus.

Career 
In 1958 DuPont earned his BA from Emory University and in 1963 earned his M.D. from Harvard Medical School. He completed training at Harvard and the National Institutes of Health. He worked for the District of Columbia Department of Corrections and in 1970 for the DC Narcotics Treatment Administration.

DuPont was the first Director of the National Institute on Drug Abuse from 1973 to 1978 and was the second White House Drug Czar from 1973 to 1977 under presidents Richard Nixon and Gerald Ford.

In 1978 he founded the Institute for Behavior and Health, Inc. In 1980 he became a clinical professor of psychiatry at the Georgetown University School of Medicine, and founded the Anxiety Disorders Association of America.

In 1981 he served as a paid consultant for Straight, Incorporated, one of the few drug treatment programs at that time that enrolled adolescents, which was criticized by some as a "controversial non-profit drug rehabilitation program", was the subject of numerous allegations of abuse, and which was successfully sued for false imprisonment and maltreatment.

In 1982 he and Peter B. Bensinger founded Bensinger, DuPont & Associates, a national consulting firm.

He maintains a psychiatric practice in Maryland specializing in addiction and anxiety disorders.

Family
His younger brother is Herbert L. DuPont, M.D. On July 14, 1962 in Hennepin County, Minnesota, Robert L. DuPont married Helen G. Spink, whose father Wesley W. Spink, M.D., mentored Herbert DuPont. Robert and Helen DuPont have two children.

Sources 
 Biography of Robert L. DuPont, MD, Institute for Behavior and Health, Inc. https://www.ibhinc.org/leadership

Notes

1936 births
Living people
People from Toledo, Ohio
Emory University alumni
Harvard Medical School alumni
Georgetown University Medical Center faculty
American psychiatrists